The 2001–02 La Liga season, the 71st since its establishment, started on 25 August 2001 and finished on 11 May 2002.

As of 2022, this is the last season that neither Barcelona or Real Madrid placed among the top two in the league table.

Teams 
Twenty teams competed in the league – the top seventeen teams from the previous season and the three teams promoted from the Segunda División. The promoted teams were Sevilla, Betis and Tenerife. Sevilla and Betis returned to the top flight after an absence of one year while Tenerife returned to the top fight after an absence of two years. They replaced Oviedo, Racing Santander and Numancia, ending their top flight spells of thirteen, eight and two-year respectively.

Team information

Clubs and locations 

2001–02 season was composed of the following clubs:

(*) Promoted from Segunda División

League table

Results

Overall 
 Most wins - Valencia (21)
 Fewest wins - UD Las Palmas and Real Zaragoza (9)
 Most draws - Málaga CF and Real Betis (14)
 Fewest draws - Deportivo Alavés (3)
 Most losses - Tenerife (20)
 Fewest losses - Valencia (5)
 Most goals scored - Real Madrid (69)
 Fewest goals scored - Tenerife (32)
 Most goals conceded - Athletic Bilbao (66)
 Fewest goals conceded - Valencia (27)

Awards

Pichichi Trophy 

The Pichichi Trophy is awarded to the player who scores the most goals in a season.

Fair Play award 

 Source: Mundo Deportivo (newspaper archive, web) and CanalDeportivo

Pedro Zaballa award 
Manuel Pablo (Deportivo de La Coruña) and Everton Giovanella (Celta Vigo) footballers

Signings 
Source: http://www.bdfutbol.com/es/t/t2001-02.html 
Players on loan are marked on italics.

See also 
 2001–02 Segunda División
 2001–02 Copa del Rey

References 

La Liga seasons
1
Spain